Solomonthrips is a genus of thrips in the family Phlaeothripidae.

Species
 Solomonthrips australiensis
 Solomonthrips brooksi
 Solomonthrips fimbrii
 Solomonthrips greensladei
 Solomonthrips indonesiensis
 Solomonthrips intermedius
 Solomonthrips setifer
 Solomonthrips striatus

References

Phlaeothripidae
Thrips
Thrips genera